Harewood speed Hillclimb (the form with italics and a lower-case s is used officially) is a hillclimb near the village of Harewood, West Yorkshire, England. The track can be found on the A659 between Harewood village and Collingham, north of Leeds. In addition to national events, it hosts rounds of the British Hill Climb Championship, a Classic & Historic Hillclimb and an event that includes bikes. Around 11 meetings are organised between April and September each year by the British Automobile Racing Club Yorkshire Centre.

The first event on the track took place on 16 September 1962, and Best Time of the Day was set at 51.61s by Tony Lanfranchi driving an Elva Mk VI. This was on the original 'Short Course'. The first R.A.C. Hill Climb Championship event was held in September, 1964. In the mid 1990s the track was extended to 1,584 yards (1,448 m). As of 2010, the outright hill record holder was Martin Groves, whose time of 49.13 seconds was set on 4 July 2010.

Harewood Hill Climb past winners

Key: R = Course Record.

Footnotes

External links
 British Automobile Racing Club - Harewood Hill near Leeds

Hillclimbs
Motorsport venues in England
1962 in motorsport
Sport in Leeds